George Paul Schmitt (born March 6, 1961) is a former American football defensive back who played for one season in the National Football League (NFL). After playing college football for the Delaware Fightin' Blue Hens, he was drafted by the St. Louis Cardinals in the sixth round of the 1983 NFL Draft. He played in all 16 games for the Cardinals in 1983.

College career
After attending Marple Newtown Senior High School in Newtown Square, Pennsylvania, Schmitt played college football for the University of Delaware Fightin' Blue Hens. Schmitt broke the school record for interceptions in a season (with 13 in 1982), career (22), and interception yards in a season (202) and career (296). Against Morgan State in 1980, he recorded three interceptions, tying him for the school record. He earned first-team All-America honors from the Associated Press and American Football Coaches Association, first-team All-Eastern College Athletic Conference, Outstanding Senior Athlete Award, and the Outstanding Senior Defensive Player Award during his senior season.

Professional career
Schmitt was drafted by the St. Louis Cardinals in the sixth round (157th overall) of the 1983 NFL Draft. In his rookie season, he recovered a fumble in the Cardinals' 44–14 win over the San Diego Chargers. He played in all 16 games for the Cardinals in 1983, his only professional season.

After football
Schmitt has been employed by the CBRE Group since 1989.

References

1961 births
Living people
People from Bryn Mawr, Pennsylvania
Players of American football from Pennsylvania
American football cornerbacks
Delaware Fightin' Blue Hens football players
St. Louis Cardinals (football) players